RNA-binding protein Nova-1 is a protein that in humans is encoded by the NOVA1 gene.

This gene encodes a neuron-specific RNA-binding protein, a member of the Nova family of paraneoplastic disease antigens, that is recognized and inhibited by paraneoplastic antibodies. These antibodies are found in the sera of patients with paraneoplastic opsoclonus-ataxia, breast cancer, and small cell lung cancer. Alternatively spliced transcripts encoding distinct isoforms have been described. Both Neanderthals and Denisovans had one version and nearly all modern humans had another suggesting positive selection. Insertion of Neanderthal gene variant of the neuro-oncological ventral antigen 1 (NOVA1) gene into human cortical organoids promoted slower development and higher surface complexity in the brain models.

References

Further reading